Arroz con gandules is a combination of rice, pigeon peas, and pork, cooked in the same pot with sofrito. This is Puerto Rico's national dish along with roasted pork.

Preparation
This dish is mainly served during Christmas season or for special occasions. The sofrito is the most important part of seasoning the rice. In Puerto Rican cooking sofrito, which is used as a base in many recipes, typically consists of the following ingredients: Recao, cilantro, yellow onions, garlic, aji dulce peppers, cubanelle peppers, and tomatoes or tomato sauce. Sofrito is blended into a watery or paste consistency. The idea is for the rice to absorb the sofrito for maximum flavor. Tomatoes are typically roasted the day of as the rest of the ingredients can be prepared together days in advance. The tomatoes are squeezed through a fine strainer 
discarding the seeds and skin.

The day of cooking the first step is cooking the pigeon peas if they are being prepared from dried form or fresh, although the canned and frozen variety are widely available in Latino markets or supermarkets in cities where there is a significant Puerto Rican population. In a separate pot, annatto seeds are heated with an oil such as olive oil, or lard. The oil is strained and seeds are discarded. Annatto oil gives the rice a distinctive yellow/orange color.

Salt pork, ham, smoked ham hocks, bacon, salchichón (salami), or chorizo is added alone or in combination. The sofrito is also sauteed in the annatto oil to release the aromatics and cooked until most of the water has evaporated while stirring gently.

A mix of manzanilla olives, piquillo peppers, and capers fermented together called alcaparrado is added with bay leaves are then added and cooked until sauce is thick almost to a paste. Rice, pigeon peas, salt, black pepper, cumin, and in some recipes  orégano brujo and coriander seeds are then added and stirred until the rice is coated with sofrito. Broth is then poured into the pot and cooked on high heat then lowered once boiling starts and covered with a plantain leaf and lid. Plantain leaves give the rice more flavor, aroma and helps cook quicker. In the countryside this is cooked over open fire pit sometimes in clay pots that help boost the flavor.

See also
 Platillo Moros y Cristianos - the equivalent in Cuba
 Gallo Pinto - the equivalent dish of Nicaragua and Costa Rica
 Hoppin' John - the equivalent dish in the Southern United States
 List of legume dishes
 List of rice dishes
 Pabellón criollo - the equivalent in Venezuela
 Rice and beans 
 Rice and peas - the equivalent in Jamaica
 Moro de guandules - the equivalent in Dominican Republic

References

External links

Arroz con gandules recipe 
Quick Arroz con gandules recipe

Christmas food
Puerto Rican cuisine
Latin American rice dishes
Legume dishes
Latin American pork dishes